FNS may refer to:

Television 
 Food Network Star, an American reality television series
 Fox News Sunday, an American television news show
 Fuji Network System, a Japanese television network
 WWE Friday Night SmackDown, an American sports television show

Other uses 
 Factorial number system
 Federal News Service, an American transcription service
 Federated Naming Service
 Finnish Navy Ship, a ship prefix
 Fire and Skoal, a student society at Dartmouth College
 Food and Nutrition Service, an agency of the United States Department of Agriculture 
 Frontier Nursing Service, an American nursing organization
 FN FNS, a semi-automatic pistol
 National Salvation Front (Russia), a defunct political coalition
 Swiss National Science Foundation

See also 
 FN (disambiguation)